Sergio Casal and Emilio Sánchez were the defending champions but none competed this year.

Joakim Nyström and Claudio Panatta won the title by defeating Christian Miniussi and Diego Nargiso 6–1, 6–4 in the final.

Seeds

Draw

Draw

References

External links
 Official results archive (ATP)
 Official results archive (ITF)

1988 Grand Prix (tennis)
ATP Bordeaux